Teloganodidae is a family of mayflies belonging to Ephemerelloidea, native to the Afrotropical and Oriental realms.

Genera 

 Derlethina Sartori, 2008 Southeast Asia
 Dudgeodes Sartori, 2008 Indian subcontinent, Southeast Asia
 Ephemerellina Lestage, 1924 South Africa
 Lestagella Demoulin, 1970 South Africa
 Lithogloea Barnard, 1932 Southern Africa
 Manohyphella Allen, 1973 Madagascar
 Nadinetella McCafferty & Wang, 1998 South Africa
 Teloganodes Eaton, 1882 (=Macafertiella Wang, 1996) Indian subcontinent

References 

Mayflies
Insect families
Taxa described in 1965